The Belarusian Peasant Party (Belorusskaia krestyanskaia partiia, BKP) was a right-wing liberal political party in Belarus.

History
The party contested the 1995 parliamentary elections, winning one seat in the second round of voting. When the National Assembly was established in 1996, the party was not given any seats in the House of Representatives.

The party folded in 1999 after failing to re-register.

References

Political parties disestablished in 1999
Defunct political parties in Belarus